Equestrian statue of George Washington may refer to:
 Equestrian statue of George Washington (Boston)
 Equestrian statue of George Washington (New York City)
 Equestrian statue of George Washington (Newark)
 Equestrian statue of George Washington (Paris)
 Equestrian statue of George Washington (Washington Circle)